HJM may refer to:
 Heath–Jarrow–Morton framework, a financial model
 Herzog–Jackson Motorsports, a NASCAR team
 Higman-Janko-McKay group, in group theory
 Hans-Joachim Marseille, German Fighter Ace